{{Infobox television
| image                    = Bou Kotha Kao (TV serial) poster.png
| image_size               = 
| image_alt                = 
| caption                  = 
| alt_name              = 
| genre                    = Drama  Comedy  Romance
| creator                  = Ravi Ojha Productions
| based_on                 = 
| developer                = 
| writer                   = Story  Mitali Bhattacharya  Dialogues  Tathagata Mukherjee
| director                 = Tathagata Mukherjee
| creative_director        = 
| presenter                = 
| starring                 = Manali Dey  Riju Biswas  Moumita Gupta
| judges                   = 
| voices                   = Title Track by Upaali Chatterjee
| narrated                 = 
| theme_music_composer     = 
| opentheme                = 
| endtheme                 = 
| composer                 = Chandan Roy Chowdhury
| country                  = India
| language                 = Bengali
| num_seasons              = 1
| num_episodes             = 913
| list_episodes            = 
| executive_producer       = 
| producer                 = Ravi Ojha
| editor                   = 
| location                 = Kolkata  Sikkim
| cinematography           = 
| camera                   = 
| runtime                  = 
| company                  = Ravi Ojha Productions
| channel                  = Star Jalsha
| picture_format           = 576i SDTV1080i HDTV
| audio_format             = 
| first_aired              = 
| last_aired               = 
| related                  = 
Bou Kotha Kao; is a television serial which was aired on Bengali GEC Star Jalsha. It was produced by Ravi Ojha Productions and was directed by Tathagata Mukherjee. It starred Riju Biswas and Manali Dey in the lead roles, and Ridhima Ghosh (later replaced by Parno Mittra) as the 2nd Female Lead and also in a negative role. It was one of the most popular TV serials of Bengali television as well as Star Jalsha and it was a blockbuster serial. It ended in January 2012. Later it was remade in Hindi as Gustakh Dil. It was re-aired on Star Jalsha during lockdown period, due to COVID-19.

Plot
Bou Kotha Kao was the story of a simple village girl Mouri and a guy from the city Nikhil. Nikhil is forcefully married to Mouri, but he is already in love with Neera and makes it very clear to Mouri that they will never share a husband–wife relationship. Nikhil's mother does not like Mouri anyway, and her sole agenda is to make life difficult for her. However, as days pass Nikhil starts falling in love with Mouri. But Nikhil's mother hates her and forces her to leave the house. Mouri puts up in a hostel and tutors Mili in order to earn a living. Mili's father Sagar Sen, a famous choreographer, helps Mouri to become a dancing sensation. Learning about her stardom, Nikhil's family welcomes Mouri back into their house and lives.

Cast

Main
 Manali Dey as Mayurakshi / Mouri
 Riju Biswas as Nikhil
 Ridhima Ghosh / Parno Mittra as Neera

Recurring
 Samrat Mukherjee as Sagar Sen
 June Malia as Sagar's late wife 
 Ashok Bhattacharya as Kamalesh, Samaresh & Swarna's father, Nikhil's paternal grandfather, head of Palashdanga village
 Debjani Chatterjee as Swarna- Nikhil's paternal aunt
 Pijush Ganguly as Swarna's husband
 Pradip Chakraborty as doctor cum priest of Palashdanga village
 Anusuya Majumdar as Niharika- Neelima's mother, Nikhil's maternal grandmother
 Kunal Padhi as Ronojoy- Nikhil's maternal uncle
 Rita Dutta Chakraborty- Nikhil's maternal aunt
 Kunal Mitra / Palash Mukherjee / Bimal Chakraborty as Kamalesh- Nolini & Nikhil's father
 Moumita Gupta as Neelima- Nolini, Akash & Nikhil's mother

 Biplab Das Gupta as Neera's father
 Unknown as Neera's mother
 Disha Ganguly as Ranjana
 Badshah Moitra as Samaresh- Gunja and Rangan's father
 Rupa Bhattacharjee / Baisakhi Marjit as Samaresh's wife, Gunja and Rangan's mother
 Bidipta Chakraborty as Aparna - Samaresh's second wife, Gunja and Rangan's stepmother
 Anish Mukherjee as Rangan
 Komalnishad Mitra     as Gunja
 Anindita Bose as Nalini
 Tathagata Mukherjee as Rudra
 Sourav Chatterjee as Sobuj- Nikhil's friend
 Ena Saha as Mahua- Mouri's younger sister
 Unknown as Sheuli- Mouri's youngest sister
 Subhadra Chakraborty as Bokul- Mouri's mother
 Milan Roy Choudhury as Girish- Mouri's father
 Rittwika Sen as Mili
 Sayak Chakraborty as Junior Artist
 Sohail Dutta as young Nikhil 
 Unknown as young Akash (deceased)
 Ronnie Chakraborty as Nikhil's friend
 Vivaan Ghosh as Raktim
 Ahmad Harhash as Raghav Arora

Productions
The show was produced by Ravi Ojha Productions. The show became very popular and it generated high TRPs like 4.2. (which was very high in those times).In 2013, the soap was telecast once again on Jalsha Movies.

Adaptations

Awards
 Best Serial (Manthan Tele Cine Awards)

References

External Website
 Website

Bengali-language television programming in India
2009 Indian television series debuts
2012 Indian television series endings
Star Jalsha original programming